The Kerry-Kildare rivalry is a Gaelic football rivalry between Irish county teams Kerry and Kildare, who first played each other in 1903. It was considered to be one of the biggest rivalries in Gaelic games during the 1920s. Kerry's home ground is Fitzgerald Stadium and Kildare's home ground is St. Conleth's Park, however, all of their championship meetings have been held at neutral venues, usually Croke Park.

While Kerry have the highest number of Munster titles and Kildare lie in third position behind Dublin and Meath on the roll of honour in Leinster, they have also enjoyed success in the All-Ireland Senior Football Championship, having won 41 championship titles between them to date.

All-time results

Legend

Senior

References

Kildare
Kildare county football team rivalries